Separator is the debut studio album of Scar Tissue, released on August 13, 1996, by 21st Circuitry. It contained mostly tracks recorded for the demo the band recorded previous to joining the label. The band's former lead singer departed before recording sessions for the album began.

Reception
Aiding & Abetting praised the band for creating effective emotional atmosphere, saying "years after the fact, Scar Tissue has created a perfect soundtrack for Bladerunner." A critic at Last Sigh Magazine gave the album a mostly positive review, calling it "dark, threatening and heavily clad" and further saying that "there are many dark ominous sections within the releases here that flirt with a semi-lighter side of the electronic technology of sound." Sonic Boom also commended the material and said "Scar Tissue is a band not content to be contained within the fragile shell of a single musical style, preferring to exhibit their musical skills across a menagerie of genres." The album peaked at the twentieth position on CMJ's Dance Top 25.

Track listing

Accolades

Personnel
Adapted from the Separator liner notes.

Scar Tissue
 Philip Caldwell – guitar
 Steve Watkins – bass guitar, electronics, percussion, production, engineering, guitar (14), vocals (17)

Additional performers
 Seann Vowell (Dofino) – vocals (2, 3, 7, 15), tape (16)
 Alex Yang (as Theatre of Cruelty) – tape (16)

Production and design
 Nathan Moody – cover art, design

Release history

References

External links 
 Separator at Bandcamp
 

1996 debut albums
Scar Tissue (band) albums
21st Circuitry albums